Nuclear debate can refer to:

Nuclear power debate
Nuclear weapons debate
Uranium mining debate
Debate over the atomic bombings of Hiroshima and Nagasaki
Nuclear Debate (foaled 1995), a recohorse